Alan Lorenzo Caldwell (born May 22, 1956) is a former professional American football defensive back in the National Football League. He attended University of North Carolina. He would play with the New York Giants in 1979.

External links
Pro-Football reference

1956 births
Living people
Players of American football from Winston-Salem, North Carolina
American football defensive backs
North Carolina Tar Heels football players
New York Giants players